A monatomic ion (also called simple ion) is an ion consisting of exactly one atom. If, instead of being monatomic, an ion contains more than one atom, even if these are of the same element, it is called a polyatomic ion. For example, calcium carbonate consists of the monatomic cation Ca2+ and the polyatomic anion ; both pentazenium and azide are polyatomic as well.

A type I binary ionic compound contains a metal that forms only one type of ion.  A type II ionic compound contains a metal that forms more than one type of ion, i.e., the same element in different oxidation states.

{|class="wikitable"
|- 
! colspan="2" | Common type I monatomic cations
|-
| Hydrogen
| H+
|-
| Lithium
| Li+
|-
| Sodium
| Na+
|-
| Potassium
| K+
|-
| Rubidium
| Rb+
|-
| Caesium
| Cs+
|-
| Magnesium
| Mg2+
|-
| Calcium
| Ca2+
|-
| Strontium
| Sr2+
|-
| Barium
| Ba2+
|-
| Aluminium
| Al3+
|-
| Silver
| Ag+
|-
| Zinc
| Zn2+
|-
|}

{|class="wikitable"
|- 
! colspan="3" | Common type II monatomic cations
|-
|-
| iron(II)
| Fe2+
| ferrous
|-
| iron(III)
| Fe3+
| ferric
|-
| copper(I)
| Cu+
| cuprous
|-
| copper(II)
| Cu2+
| cupric
|-
| cobalt(II)
| Co+2
| cobaltous
|-
| cobalt(III)
| Co3+
| cobaltic
|-
| tin(II)
| Sn2+
| stannous
|-
| tin(IV)
| Sn4+
| stannic
|}

{|class="wikitable"
|- 
! colspan="2" | Common monatomic anions
|-
| hydride
| H−
|-
| fluoride
| F−
|-
| chloride
| Cl−
|-
| bromide
| Br−
|-
| iodide
| I−
|-
| oxide
| O2−
|-
| sulfide
| S2−
|-
| nitride
| N3−
|-
| phosphide
| P3−
|-
|}

References

Ions